Matt Jones is the co-author - with Gary Marsden - of Mobile Interaction Design and a full research Professor at Swansea University. With the late Marsden and Simon Robinson he authored a new book in 2015 - There's Not an App for That (Morgan Kaufmann). He is an active researcher and has organized large scale of scientific conferences such as ACM CHI 2014. He has also edited several special issues of journals including an ACM ToCHI journal special issue on social issues and the "turn to the wild".

His work has included studies and prototypes for mobile search and browsing; pedestrian navigation; and multi-modality. Since the early 2000s he has been actively pursuing a mobile research agenda focused on interfaces and interactions for "developing world" users, looking at how to address issues around lower computer and textual literacy and resource access. He has been awarded a Royal Society Wolfson Research Merit Award for this work.

He has worked with many industry partners such as Microsoft Research, Reuters and Orange. He has spent time as visiting fellow at Nokia Research, Finland. He was also on the Scientific Advisory Board of Nokia Research (Tampere and Helsinki Labs). In 2010 he was awarded an IBM Faculty Award to work with the Spoken Web group in IBM Research India (Delhi).

From March 2011 to August 2014 he was Head of the Department of Computer Science at Swansea University.

From 2014 he has been Head of Science at Swansea University.

From October 2020 he is the founding director of the Morgan Advanced Studies Institute (www.swansea.ac.uk/masi)

He is the Director of the EPSRC Centre for Doctoral Training in Human Driven AI and is the Principal Investigator of the £32.5M Computational Foundry.

External links 
Morgan Advanced Studies Institute
 Personal home page
 Links to projects and publications by M Jones
 StoryBank – using mobiles to share stories in an Indian village., Matt Jones in receiver magazine, summer 2008
 

Living people
Year of birth missing (living people)